Murmur is the debut studio album by American alternative rock band R.E.M., released on April 12, 1983, by I.R.S. Records. Murmur drew critical acclaim upon its release for its unusual sound, defined by lead singer Michael Stipe's cryptic lyrics, guitarist Peter Buck's jangly guitar style, and bass guitarist Mike Mills' melodic basslines.

Recording
R.E.M. started preparing for their debut album in December 1982. I.R.S. paired R.E.M. with producer Stephen Hague, who had a higher profile than the band's previous producer Mitch Easter. Hague's emphasis on technical perfection did not suit the band; the producer made the group perform multiple takes of the song "Catapult", which demoralized drummer Bill Berry. Also, Hague took the completed track to Synchro Sound studios in Boston and added keyboard parts to the track without the band's permission and to their dismay. Unsatisfied, the band members asked the label to let them record with Easter. I.R.S. agreed to a "tryout" session, allowing the band to travel to North Carolina and record the song "Pilgrimage" with Easter and producing partner Don Dixon. After hearing the track, I.R.S. permitted the group to record the album with Dixon and Easter.

On January 6, 1983, R.E.M. entered Reflection Studios in Charlotte, North Carolina, to begin recording sessions with Easter and Dixon. Much of the band's material for the album had been tested on preceding tours. Because of its bad experience with Hague, the band recorded the album via a process of negation, refusing to incorporate rock music clichés such as guitar solos or then-popular synthesizers, to give its music a timeless feel. Berry specifically was resistant to "odd" musical suggestions, insisting that his drums be recorded in a drummer's booth, a practice that was antiquated at the time. Dixon and Easter took a hands-off approach to much of the recording process. The pair would only fix up a vocal track or ask lead singer Michael Stipe to re-record a vocal if it was very substandard. Recording was completed on February 23, 1983.

Packaging

The front cover features an image of a large quantity of the noxious weed kudzu, which grows so rapidly that it overtakes the landscape and kills other plants by completely shading them. The trestle featured on the back cover of the original vinyl LP release, originally part of the Georgia Railroad line into downtown Athens, has become something of a local landmark. Plans to demolish the trestle, now commonly referred to as the "Murmur Trestle", met with public outcry. On October 2, 2000, the Athens-Clarke County Mayor and Commission voted to save the trestle. In 2012, the local government said it can not afford to keep it and declared in 2016 that it would likely come down. Later that year, the Athens-Clarke County Commission suggested that a trail tax could fund its existence. The Murmur Trestle was approved for demolition in 2019, and work began in 2020 to destroy it. A replica of the original trestle is intended to be constructed, as well as preservation of some of the original trestle.

Copies of the initial tape edition—catalogue number CS 70604—list The Velvet Underground cover "There She Goes Again" as the final track, but it is not present. This mistake was fixed with subsequent printings. The track was intended for Murmur, but removed so that all the tracks would be original and the group would not have to take a royalty cut. It was, however, included as a b-side to the IRS issue of "Radio Free Europe" instead.

Critical reception

Murmur was released in April 1983. The record reached number 36 on the Billboard album chart. A re-recorded version of "Radio Free Europe" was the album's lead single and reached number 78 on the Billboard singles chart that year. Despite the acclaim awarded the album, by the end of 1983 Murmur had only sold about 200,000 copies, which I.R.S.'s Jay Boberg felt was below expectations. Murmur was eventually certified gold (500,000 units shipped) by the Recording Industry Association of America in 1991.

The album drew substantial critical acclaim. Rolling Stone gave the album four out of five stars. Reviewer Steve Pond felt the album fulfilled the promise the band showed on Chronic Town. He wrote, "Murmur is the record on which [R.E.M.] trade that potential for results: an intelligent, enigmatic, deeply involving album, it reveals a depth and cohesiveness to R.E.M. that the EP could only suggest." He concluded, "R.E.M. is clearly the important Athens band." Jonathan Gregg of Record described Murmur as "a splendid little film noir of an album, austere but rich in implication." He particularly praised the band's distinctive "twitchy, restless dance beat" and the incomprehensibility of the album's meaning, noting that Stipe's already enigmatic lyrics are often hard to make out due to being sung with a deliberate slur, lost in a muddy mix, and/or drowned out by the instrumental work, resulting in an impressive sense of meaning even as the meaning itself is not understood. It was Rolling Stones Best Album of 1983, beating Michael Jackson's Thriller, The Police's Synchronicity and U2's War. Buck noted in 2002 that I.R.S. was "mind-boggled" by the album's positive reviews, especially in the British press, since R.E.M. had not yet toured that country.

Accolades
Since its release, Murmur has featured heavily in various "must have" lists compiled by the music media. In 1989, it was rated number eight on Rolling Stone magazine's list of the 100 greatest albums of the 1980s. In 2003, the TV network VH1 named Murmur the 92nd greatest album of all time. Some of the more prominent of these lists to feature Murmur are shown below; this information is adapted from acclaimedmusic.net. The album was also included in the book 1001 Albums You Must Hear Before You Die.

Track listing
All songs written by Bill Berry, Peter Buck, Mike Mills and Michael Stipe, except where noted.Side one"Radio Free Europe" – 4:06
"Pilgrimage" – 4:30
"Laughing" – 3:57
"Talk About the Passion" – 3:23
"Moral Kiosk" – 3:31
"Perfect Circle" – 3:29Side two"Catapult" – 3:55
"Sitting Still" – 3:17
"9–9" – 3:03
"Shaking Through" – 4:30
"We Walk" – 3:02
"West of the Fields" (Berry, Buck, Mills, Stipe, Neil Bogan) – 3:17

PersonnelR.E.M.Bill Berry – drums, backing vocals, percussion, bass guitar, piano
Peter Buck – electric & acoustic guitars
Mike Mills – bass guitar, backing vocals, piano, organ, acoustic guitar, vibraphone on "Pilgrimage"
Michael Stipe – lead vocalsProduction and additional musiciansGreg Calbi – mastering at Sterling Sound, New York City, New York, United States
Don Dixon – co-producer, additional acoustic guitars, bass guitar on "Perfect Circle"
Mitch Easter – co-producer, additional acoustic guitars, backwards guitar on "Perfect Circle" 
Carl Grasso – art design
Ann Kinney – art design
Sandra Lee Phipps – photography and art design

Chart performanceSingles'''

Certifications

Release historyMurmur was bundled together with Chronic Town and Reckoning in the United Kingdom as The Originals in 1993.

On November 25, 2008, I.R.S. Records, A&M, and Universal Music released a 25th anniversary edition two-disc reissue of Murmur. Disc one features the standard 12-track album, digitally remastered, and disc two contains a previously unreleased live concert the band played at Larry's Hideaway, Toronto, Canada, on July 9, 1983. This set was recorded by Blair Packham, who'd later find fame as lead singer of The Jitters.

In addition to Murmur songs, the set includes tunes from the Chronic Town EP, a Velvet Underground cover, and early versions of songs from Reckoning and Lifes Rich Pageant. The release also includes a fold-out poster insert, featuring exclusive essays by producers Don Dixon and Mitch Easter, as well as former I.R.S. executives Jay Boberg, Sig Sigworth, and art designer Carl Grasso.

†I.R.S. Vintage Years edition, with bonus tracks
‡Remastered edition on 180-gram vinyl and gold Compact Disc
•Remastered Deluxe Edition, with Live at Larry's Hide-Away'' bonus disc

See also

Murmur (record label)
Paisley Underground

References

Further reading

External links
R.E.M. HQ on Murmur

 (I.R.S. Vintage Years edition)
 (Deluxe Edition)

 (I.R.S. Vintage Years edition)
 (Deluxe Edition)
A detailed explanation of the lyrics from Consequence of Sound

1983 debut albums
Albums produced by Don Dixon (musician)
Albums produced by Mitch Easter
I.R.S. Records albums
R.E.M. albums
Post-punk albums by American artists
Garage rock albums by American artists